April 18 is a 1984 Malayalam-language film written and directed by Balachandra Menon, who also features in the lead role. It also stars Shobana, Adoor Bhasi and Bharat Gopy in other pivotal roles.It was the debut Malayalam movie of Shobana as Lead actress. The musical score was composed by A. T. Ummer.

Plot
Inspector Ravi marries Sobhana after a love affair and they lead a very happy married life. He is also a very strict police officer. Ravi purchases a saree on behalf of his friend who is in jail and hides this from Sobhana on the advice of Gopi Pillai. This leads to suspicion and Sobhana leaving to her home, expecting Ravi to take her back. However things take a turn when Ravi arrests Jimmy, son of Marcose, against his father in law's (Narayana Pillai) wishes. An aggrieved Narayana Pillai files divorce suit despite objections from Sobhana and appoint Thomachan as his legal counsel. Irony is that Thomachan is a close friend of Ravi and they live in the same apartment. As Thomachan's arguments hurt Sobhana, Ravi agrees for separation to save a pregnant Sobhana from further humiliation. The court adjourns for decree on April 18 and outside the court things take a complete turnaround.

Cast
Balachandra Menon as Sub Inspector Ravikumar
Shobana as Sobhana 
Adoor Bhasi as Narayana Pillai (Sobhana's father)
Bharat Gopy as Gopi Pillai Head Constable.
Unni Mary as wife of Thomachan
Venu Nagavalli as adv George Thomas alias Thomachan
Roshni as Thomachan's Daughter
Jose Prakash as Marcose
Sukumari as Judge
Adoor Bhavani as Naniyamma
Santhosh as Jacob
KPAC Sunny as DIG Santhosh Varma
Baiju as Boy in Police Station

Soundtrack

All songs were composed by A. T. Ummer and lyrics were written by Bichu Thirumala.

References

External links
  
 
april 18 Malayalam movie

1984 films
1980s Malayalam-language films